Bernard Petrák (born 15 December 1999) is a Slovak professional footballer who plays as a left-back for FC Košice .

Club career

FK Pohronie
Petrák had joined Pohronie on a half-season contract ahead of the 2020–21 season, making the Žiar nad Hronom-based club his first top division career stop.

Petrák made his Fortuna Liga debut for Pohronie in a first round away fixture at ViOn Aréna against ViOn Zlaté Moravce on 8 August 2020. Petrák entered the play after 68 minutes of the game, replacing Richard Župa, when Pohronie trailed two goals behind, after two first-half goals by Tomáš Ďubek and Petrák's former team-mate Martin Kovaľ. Late in the match however, Pohronie managed to equalise through Alieu Fadera and stoppage time free kick by James Weir.

References

External links
 MŠK Žilina official club profile 
 Futbalnet profile 
 
 

1999 births
Living people
Sportspeople from Voronezh
Slovak footballers
Slovak expatriate footballers
Association football defenders
MŠK Žilina players
FK Železiarne Podbrezová players
FK Pohronie players
Odra Opole players
FC Košice (2018) players
2. Liga (Slovakia) players
Slovak Super Liga players
I liga players
Expatriate footballers in Poland
Slovak expatriate sportspeople in Poland